Salimata Traoré is a politician and member of the national assembly in Mali born in 1994.

See also
Politics of Mali

References

Malian politicians
Living people
1994 births